Phoxinus karsticus is a species of fish in the family Cyprinidae, the carps and minnows. It was described in 2015 from Popovo Polje in Bosnia and Herzegovina. It is probably endemic to the rivers of this region.

References

karsticus
Taxa named by Pier Giorgio Bianco
Taxa named by Salvatore De Bonis
Fish described in 2015